Ana Lilia Duran Ayon (born ) is a Mexican female weightlifter, who competed in the 63 kg category and represented Mexico at international competitions. She won the silver medal at the 2014 Summer Youth Olympics.

Major results

References

External links
https://www.elsoldetijuana.com.mx/deportes-local/ana-lilia-duran-lidera-a-halteristas-en-2017
https://www.esto.com.mx/45200-ana-lilia-duran-la-nina-prodigio-de-las-pesas/

1997 births
Living people
Mexican female weightlifters
Sportspeople from Mexicali
Weightlifters at the 2014 Summer Youth Olympics
21st-century Mexican women